SMK Puteri is an all-girl secondary school in Seremban, Malaysia. The school is widely known as Puteri.

History

Japanese Occupation
During Japanese Occupation, the school is being used as shelter for sisters and orphanage from Taiping and Singapore. After Japanese left on 1 Oct 1945, the school is reopened and accept 800 new students and the school continue expand.

New school
SMK Puteri was built to replace the old and SMK Convent building. A plot of land near Taman AST was chosen to built new school. On 8 July 1993, ground breaking ceremony was done by Menteri Besar Mohd Isa Samad.

Total cost for the school is RM5,305,170.00. The new school has 7 blocks that consists of 3 levels, 2 blocks consists 2 levels and 2 blocks consists only one level.

Curriculum 
Results of PMR 2006

Percentage of pass in every subject

Enrollment 
Student

Co-curricular

Hockey
 2007
 Kejohanan Hoki Tunas Cemerlang Kebangsaan – Champion
 Karnival Sukan Sekolah-Sekolah Premier Kebangsaan – Runners-up
 Anugerah Guru Berjasa Sukan Kementerian Pelajaran Malaysia
 2008
 Hoki KILAT 6's & 7's – Champion
 Kejohanan Sukan-Sekolah Premier Zon Selatan – Runners-up
 Kejohanan Hoki MSSM – 5th
 Anugerah Jasamu DiKenang Jabatan Pelajaran Negeri Sembilan
 2009
 Kejohanan Hoki Juara-Juara Sekolah Kebangsaan – Fourth place & Anugerah Pemain Harapan
 Kejohanan Sukan Institusi Pendidikan Malaysia (SIPMA) – Runners-up

School anthem 
Sekolah Menengah Puteri
Mendukung wawasan negara
Memupuk semangat nilai murni
Lahirkan pelajar yang berwibawa

Kami puteri ibu pertiwi
Janji setia tuju wawasan diri
Cemerlang semat di hati
Sikap dedikasi subur wangi

Sekolah Menengah Puteri
Cemerlang, Gemilang, Terbilang
Kualiti teras kecemerlangan
Visi dan misi jadi panduan

Kami puteri ibu pertiwi
Janji setia tuju wawasan diri
Cemerlang semat di hati
Sikap dedikasi subur wangi

Notable alumni 
 Aina Abdul - singer and actress.
 Vanessa Tevi - model and Miss Universe Malaysia 2015.

References

External links
 Official website)

Schools in Negeri Sembilan
Secondary schools in Malaysia